Tractor Stadium or Tractor's Shahid Bakeri  Stadium is a stadium in Tabriz, Iran. It is currently used mostly for football matches Tractor Academy and training ground for the Tractor. The stadium holds 7,000 people and renovated in 2011 by Iran Tractor Manufacturing Company.

See also
 Sahand Stadium
 Takhti Stadium (Tabriz)
 Marzdaran Stadium

References

Football venues in Iran
Sports venues in Tabriz
Tractor S.C.
Association football training grounds in Iran